Slender Rising is a terror psychological first person iOS game by developer Michael Hegemann. It was published on November 12, 2012, and runs on all Apple iOS devices from iPhone 3GS upwards. The game was updated ever since the release and since January 5, 2013, there is a free version available. The game is based on the online Slender Man mythos, where the player must avoid the dangerous entity known as the Slender Man. It is the third video game adaptation based on the aforementioned character.

In 2014 the game was also ported on Android, but in 2018 was removed from Google Play and was no longer updated.

Gameplay 
Slender Rising is designed as a single-player game. In the game, the player moves around an enclosed and labyrinthine location (from which there are several to choose from) and search for signs/pages scattered throughout the map. While doing so, they must avoid the enemy, a hostile supernatural being known as the Slender Man.

The signs are randomly scattered across the map. Ghostly whisper sound effects help the player find them, as well as a red arrow if the compass option is selected. The Slender Man stalks the player around the map, and can teleport closer to the player, but they must avoid looking at the enemy. When the player sees the Slender Man, they must quickly look away or they will be killed (and lose the round). Two gameplay options are available: an infinite mode where the player must find as many signs as possible before they are killed by the enemy; or a limited mode where they must collect seven signs, whilst Slender Man becomes increasingly more aggressive as they progress. Difficulty can also be selected.

Four different maps/locations are available to play in: the Cursed Ruins, an old cemetery; the Desolate Town, a deserted ghost town; the Haunted Forest; and the Lost Ward, an abandoned asylum. The user can also select from multiple options of aesthetic ambience, including a daytime mode and nighttime modes (with several variations).

Reception 

The game has received highly positive reviews. Slender Rising reached no. 3 in the U.S. and no. 7 in German app charts. It is currently found among the top 200 paid iPhone games.

David Craddock of TouchArcade said of the game, "Slender Rising is arguably the best take on Slender one yet and inarguably the pinnacle of the myth on iOS."

Edward Smith of the International Business Times stated, "Slender Rising is excellent. It's dead scary and it adds a lot of smart, welcome new ideas to the original game."

Sequel
In January 2014, the sequel Slender Rising 2 was published on the App Store. It features new maps and new game mechanics.

External links 
 Official Slender Rising Trailer
 Slender Rising on the App Store

References

2013 video games
IOS games
Slender Man
Works based on Internet-based works
Single-player video games